Owtanlu (also Romanized as Owtānlū, Atanloo, Otānlū, and Ūtānlū; also known as Otalli, Otānlī, and Ūtalī) is a village in Takab Rural District, in the Central District of Dargaz County, Razavi Khorasan Province, Iran. At the 2006 census, its population was 249, in 75 families.

References 

Populated places in Dargaz County